Invenio is an open source software framework for large-scale digital repositories that provides the tools for management of digital assets in an institutional repository and research data management systems. The software is typically used for open access repositories for scholarly and/or published digital content and as a digital library.

Invenio is initially developed by CERN with both individual and organisational external contributors and is freely available for download.

History
Prior to July 1, 2006, the package was named CDSware, then renamed CDS Invenio, and now known simply as Invenio.

Standards
Invenio complies with standards such as the Open Archives Initiative metadata harvesting protocol (OAI-PMH) and uses JSON/JSONSchema as its underlying bibliographic format.

Support
The service provider TIND Technologies, an official CERN spin-off based in Norway, offers Invenio via a software-as-a-service model.

Variants of Invenio are offered by TIND for all library services as TIND ILS, DA, IR and RDM under a fully hosted and open-core model.

Users
Invenio is widely used outside of its original home within CERN, including SLAC National Accelerator Laboratory, Fermilab, and the École Polytechnique Fédérale de Lausanne. SPIRES migrated to Invenio in October 2011 with the INSPIRE-HEP site, a joint effort of CERN, DESY, SLAC and FNAL.

In 2014, the package was chosen to be the digital library software of all national universities in the western Africa regional economic community UEMOA which includes eight countries: Benin, Burkina Faso, Côte d'Ivoire, Guinea-Bissau, Mali, Niger, Senegal, Togo.

The research data repository Zenodo at CERN is basically run under Invenio v3, wrapped by a small extra layer of code that is also called Zenodo.  To simplify reuse of the Zenodo codebase, several institutions have joined in 2019 to distribute an institution-agnostic package under the name of InvenioRDM.

See also

 Digital library
 Institutional repository

References

External links
 Official website

 List of sites running Invenio
 Short description about some of the features of Invenio
 Service provider for Invenio support, installation, training, etc

Digital library software
Free institutional repository software
Free software programmed in Python
CERN software